KSw 71 is a rapidly-spinning star in the constellation of Lyra. It is thought to have formed after two stars in a close binary system merged; its rotation has deformed it into an oblate spheroid shape. KSw 71 was discovered, alongside other pumpkin-shaped stars by NASA's Kepler and Swift missions and produces X-rays at more than 100 times the peak levels ever seen from the Sun.

18 "pumpkin stars" have been discovered, including this one.

References

External links
 

Astronomical objects discovered in 2016
K-type subgiants
K-type giants
J19141726+4236315
Lyra (constellation)